Confluence is a borough in Somerset County, Pennsylvania, United States. It is part of the Johnstown, Pennsylvania, Metropolitan Statistical Area. The population was 724 at the 2020 census.

Geography

Confluence is at  (39.809997, -79.356692). The borough is located at the southern end of Lower Turkeyfoot Township, and the borough of Ursina sits to its east. 

Confluence is named for the juncture of the Casselman River and Laurel Hill Creek with the Youghiogheny River. It therefore provides many opportunities for boating and fishing (and hiking, as Pennsylvania's highest point, Mount Davis, is located nearby).

The borough is bordered to the south by the  Youghiogheny River Lake and to the north by the  Ohiopyle State Park.

Climate
The climate in this area has mild differences between highs and lows, and there is adequate rainfall year-round.  According to the Köppen Climate Classification system, Confluence has a marine west coast climate, abbreviated "Cfb" on climate maps.

Demographics

At the 2000 census there were 834 people, 349 households, and 211 families residing in the borough. The population density was 522.4 people per square mile (201.3/km2). There were 404 housing units at an average density of 253.0 per square mile (97.5/km2).  The racial makeup of the borough was 99.52% White, 0.24% African American, and 0.24% from two or more races. Hispanic or Latino of any race were 0.24%.

Of the 349 households, 25.8% had children under the age of 18 living with them, 48.4% were married couples living together, 9.2% had a female householder with no husband present, and 39.3% were non-families. 34.4% of households were one person, and 21.8% were one person aged 65 or older. The average household size was 2.26 and the average family size was 2.91.

In the borough the population was spread out, with 20.3% under the age of 18, 7.0% from 18 to 24, 26.9% from 25 to 44, 22.7% from 45 to 64, and 23.3% 65 or older. The median age was 42 years. For every 100 females there were 84.9 males. For every 100 females age 18 and over, there were 79.7 males.

The median household income was $23,462 and the median family income was $31,181. Males had a median income of $26,705 versus $19,750 for females. The per capita income for the borough was $12,129. About 15.0% of families and 21.2% of the population were below the poverty line, including 28.7% of those under age 18 and 20.4% of those age 65 or over.

References

External links

 Confluence, PA

Boroughs in Somerset County, Pennsylvania
1873 establishments in Pennsylvania